The 1994–95 Auburn Tigers men's basketball team represented Auburn University in the 1994–95 college basketball season. The team's head coach was Cliff Ellis, who was in his first season at Auburn. The team played their home games at Beard–Eaves–Memorial Coliseum in Auburn, Alabama. They finished the season 16–13, 7–9 in SEC play. They defeated South Carolina to advance to the quarterfinals of the SEC tournament where they lost to Kentucky. They received an invitation to the National Invitation Tournament, where they lost to Marquette in the first round.

References

Auburn Tigers men's basketball seasons
Auburn
Auburn
Auburn
Auburn